The English Association of Snooker and Billiards (EASB), based in Surrey, England, was launched by the World Professional Billiards and Snooker Association (WPBSA) in 1993 with the aim of the EASB becoming the governing body for amateur snooker and English billiards. It was funded by the WPBSA until 2002, when as one of the measures that the WPBSA took to cut costs, it was given a final one-off payment of £50,000. The link with the professional association had meant that the EASB was not recognised by Sport England as an amateur body.

It became recognised by Sport England as the National Governing Body for snooker and English Billiards in England. It actively promoted these sports, arranging competitions and fostering talent through coaching and development. The EASB organised a substantial number of events for amateur players each season; the flagship events being the English Amateur Championship and the Paul Hunter English Open. The EASB actively sought to acquire new player members and aimed to develop the talent of players of all ages through competition experience and coaching, allowing players to develop significantly and build towards a professional career. EASB tournaments were often a stepping stone to success in professional snooker and the EASB was dedicated to providing aspiring players with a platform for elite competition.

The English Partnership for Snooker and Billiards has been responsible for the governance of amateur snooker in England since June 2019, when a resolution was passed by the English Association of Snooker and Billiards to transfer its assets and operations to the EPSB.

References

 Official EASB Website

Snooker in England
Organisations based in Surrey
Snooker governing bodies